Nolan McDonald (born July 29, 1977) is a Canadian former professional ice hockey goaltender. He was selected by the Vancouver Canucks in the 6th round (147th overall) of the 1996 NHL Entry Draft.

McDonald spent the majority of his professional career playing in the German 2nd Bundesliga where, in 2003, he was selected as the Goaltender of the Year. Nolan is credited as being the first goaltender in the history of the German Bundesliga to be named his team's captain.

McDonald now owns a film studio in New Brunswick, Canada. He has executive produced the film " Decoding annie parker" starring Helen Hunt, Samantha Morton and Aaron Paul.

References

External links

1977 births
Canadian ice hockey goaltenders
Columbus Cottonmouths (ECHL) players
EV Landshut players
Fort Worth Brahmas players
Hull Olympiques players
Ice hockey people from Ontario
Kalamazoo Wings (UHL) players
Kassel Huskies players
Lake Charles Ice Pirates players
Lausitzer Füchse players
Living people
Pee Dee Pride players
Raleigh IceCaps players
South Carolina Stingrays players
Spokane Chiefs players
Sportspeople from Thunder Bay
Vancouver Canucks draft picks
Vermont Catamounts men's ice hockey players
Canadian expatriate ice hockey players in Germany